Phonetica is a peer-reviewed academic journal of phonetics that was established in 1957 by E. Zwirner. It is published by De Gruyter. Its current editor-in-chief is Catherine T. Best, Bankstown, N.S.W.

External links
 

Phonetics journals
De Gruyter academic journals
Publications established in 1957
English-language journals
Quarterly journals